Somerset Hospital may refer to:
 Somerset Hospital (Cape Town), a public hospital in Cape Town, South Africa
 Somerset Hospital (Pennsylvania), a hospital in Somerset, Pennsylvania, United States
 Somerset Hospital, almshouses in Froxfield, Wiltshire, England
 Somerset Medical Center in Somerville, New Jersey, now Robert Wood Johnson University Hospital Somerset,  originally known as Somerset Hospital